COMEC may refer to:
CSSC Offshore & Marine Engineering (Group) Company Limited, COMEC, is the largest modern integrated shipbuilding enterprise based in Southern China
Council of Military Education Committees of the Universities of the United Kingdom, COMEC, represents university interests in policy development in officer training